William Bruce Gordon Johnstone (30 January 1937 – 3 March 2022) was a South African racing driver. He participated in one Formula One (F1) World Championship Grand Prix, on 29 December 1962. He scored no championship points. He also competed in the F1 non-championship 1962 Oulton Park Gold Cup where he finished fourth and in the South African Formula 1 Championship.

Johnstone died on 3 March 2022, at the age of 85.

Complete Formula One World Championship results 
(key)

References

Profile at grandprix.com

1937 births
2022 deaths
BRM Formula One drivers
South African Formula One drivers
South African racing drivers
White South African people
Sportspeople from Durban